Northumberland—Quinte West was a provincial electoral district in Ontario, Canada, that was represented in the Legislative Assembly of Ontario between the 2007 provincial election and the 2018 provincial election.  Its population in 2001 was 118,906.

Geography
The district includes the County of Northumberland and the City of Quinte West.

History
The electoral district was created in 2003: 86.1% of the riding came from Northumberland riding and 13.9% from Prince Edward—Hastings riding.  In 2018, the riding was dissolved into Northumberland—Peterborough South and Bay of Quinte.

Members of Provincial Parliament

Election results

		

	

|align="left" colspan=2|Liberal hold
|align="right"|Swing
|align="right"|  +3.51
|

^ Change is from redistributed results

2007 electoral reform referendum

Sources

Elections Ontario 2011 Candidates Northumberland--Quinte West
Elections Ontario Past Election Results

Former provincial electoral districts of Ontario
Cobourg
Quinte West